The 2010 FIFA World Cup qualification UEFA Group 5 was a UEFA qualifying group for the 2010 FIFA World Cup. The group comprised European champions Spain, Turkey, Belgium, Bosnia and Herzegovina, Armenia and Estonia.

The group was won by Spain, who qualified for the 2010 FIFA World Cup without dropping a single point in qualification. The runners-up Bosnia and Herzegovina entered the UEFA play-off stage.

Standings

Matches
A meeting was held in Barcelona, Spain on 8 January 2008 to determine the fixtures for Group 5. However, the Bosnian delegation arrived several hours late, and Spain and Turkey were unable to agree on scheduling. Since the fixtures were not finalised by 16 January 2008 deadline, FIFA conducted a random draw to determine the fixtures. The draw took place in Zagreb, Croatia at 16:00 CET on 30 January 2008, on the eve of the XXXII Ordinary UEFA Congress.

Goalscorers
There were 94 goals scored during the 30 games, an average of 3.13 goals per game.

9 goals
 Edin Džeko

7 goals
 David Villa

6 goals
 Wesley Sonck

5 goals
 Zvjezdan Misimović

4 goals
 Zlatan Muslimović

3 goals

 Konstantin Vassiljev
 Juan Mata
 Gerard Piqué
 David Silva
 Tuncay

2 goals

 Emile Mpenza
 Senijad Ibričić
 Sergei Zenjov
 Cesc Fàbregas
 Álvaro Negredo
 Emre Belözoğlu
 Semih Şentürk
 Arda Turan

1 goal

 Robert Arzumanyan
 Gevorg Ghazaryan
 Hovhannes Goharyan
 Sargis Hovsepyan
 Vahagn Minasyan
 Henrikh Mkhitaryan
 Steven Defour
 Mousa Dembélé
 Marouane Fellaini
 Gill Swerts
 Daniel Van Buyten
 Zlatan Bajramović
 Vedad Ibišević
 Sanel Jahić
 Sejad Salihović
 Emir Spahić
 Andres Oper
 Raio Piiroja
 Sander Puri
 Vladimir Voskoboinikov
 Xabi Alonso
 Joan Capdevila
 Santi Cazorla
 Andrés Iniesta
 Juanito
 Carles Puyol
 Albert Riera
 Marcos Senna
 Halil Altıntop
 Servet Çetin
 Mevlüt Erdinç
 Sercan Yıldırım

Attendances

References

5
2008–09 in Bosnia and Herzegovina football
2009–10 in Bosnia and Herzegovina football
Qual
2008–09 in Spanish football
2008–09 in Turkish football
2009–10 in Turkish football
2008–09 in Belgian football
2009–10 in Belgian football
2009 in Armenian football
2008 in Armenian football
2009 in Estonian football
2008 in Estonian football